Toni Huuhka (born 4 February 1989) is a Finnish former footballer and current assistant coach for FC Lahti.

Career 
Huuhka played in the Veikkausliiga for FC Lahti and FC Hämeenlinna, as well in the Kakkonen for FC Kuusysi, FC Lahti Akatemia and FC City Stars.

Coaching career 
In October 2015 retired and was named on 20 October as Assistant coach by FC Lahti.

References

1989 births
Living people
Finnish footballers
Veikkausliiga players
FC Lahti players
Finnish football managers
Association football central defenders
Sportspeople from Lahti